Kasenyi is a village in Ngedwo sub county, Buliisa District, in the Western Region of Uganda. It is the location of a "central processing facility" (CPF) of Uganda's oil fields in the Albertine Graben.

Location

The geographical coordinates of Kasenyi are:02°12'09.0"N, 31°28'59.0"E (Latitude:2.202500; Longitude:31.483056).

Overview
The village of Kasenyi has been selected by the government of Uganda and the three major oil companies exploring for oil in Western Uganda; to include "the Central Processing Facility (CPF), construction camps, accommodation facilities, a workshop and feeder pipelines". The three oil companies have named the petroleum project in Buliisa District "Tilenga", after an antelope in Acholi and Bunyoro. The antelope is called Til in Acholi and Engabi in Bunyoro.

The crude oil extracte in Buliisa and Nwoya districts will be processed at Tilenga to extract water, gas and other impurities, before being piped to the refinery in Kabaale in Hoima District.

There will be another CPF located in Buhuka in Hoima District to process crude oil from the Kingfisher Development Area before piping it to the refinery. Tilenga is projected to yield 200,000 barrels of crude oil per day.

See also
 Uganda Oil Refinery
 Uganda–Tanzania Crude Oil Pipeline
 Hoima–Kampala Petroleum Products Pipeline

References

External links
 Buliisa District Information Portal

Populated places in Western Region, Uganda
Cities in the Great Rift Valley
Buliisa District
Bunyoro sub-region